Köster is a German surname. Notable people with the surname include:

Adolf Köster (1883-1930), German politician and diplomat
Bärbel Köster (b. 1957), German athlete
Franz Köster (f. 1940s), German Luftwaffe pilot during World War II
Fritz Köster (1855-1934), German trade unionist
Gaby Köster (born 1961), German actress
Johann Adolf Köster (1550-1630), German pastor and educator 
Maartje Köster (born 1975), Dutch cricketer

See also
 Koester
 Koster (surname)

German-language surnames